Urson may refer to:
 Frank Urson (1887–1928), American silent film director and cinematographer
 Ursolic acid
 North American porcupine